Stoe Creek Bridge was a historic structure located northwest of Oelwein, Iowa, United States. In June and July 1913, the Fayette County Board of Supervisors awarded contracts for several small bridges in the county. The Iowa State Highway Commission designed this single span bridge that was built by N.M. Stark and Company of Des Moines. It was completed in 1914 for $1,654. The bridge was listed on the National Register of Historic Places in 1998. It was replaced in 2007.

See also

References

Transport infrastructure completed in 1914
Bridges in Fayette County, Iowa
National Register of Historic Places in Fayette County, Iowa
Road bridges on the National Register of Historic Places in Iowa
Girder bridges in the United States
1914 establishments in Iowa
2007 disestablishments in Iowa